Joey Tavernese (born July 17, 1989) is an American soccer, indoor, and futsal player who is currently playing for Utica City FC in the Major Arena Soccer League and for Rochester Lancers 2 in Major Arena Soccer League 2, where his also serves as an assistant coach.

Youth
Tavernese played for the Terryville Fire, who were the 2007 National Champions.  He posted a goal in the National semi-finals to send the Fire into the National Championship.

College
Tavernese played four years of college soccer at Siena College.  In 2007, he started nine games in his 19 appearances and was selected to the MAAC All-Rookie Team.  In 2008, he started 13 games in his 18 appearances and finished with 3 goals and 1 assist.  In 2009, he made 19 and finished with 3 goals and 5 assists.  In 2010, he made 19 appearances and finished with a career high 4 goals and 9 assists.

Professional
After starting 2011 in the USL Premier Development League for the Westchester Flames, Tavernese signed for USL Pro club F.C. New York on June 23, 2011.  On July 4, Tavernese record his first career point.  Assisting on a Jhonny Arteaga goal in New York's 3-1 home loss against the Charlotte Eagles. He is currently playing for the Syracuse Silver Knights. Tavernese was named offensive MVP for the Silver Knights in 2016.

On May 30, 2019, Tavernese signed with Florida Tropics SC.

Tavernese joined the coaching staff of Major Arena Soccer League 2 side Rochester Lancers 2 in January 2023.

References

External links
 Siena Saints bio
 

1989 births
Living people
American soccer players
Westchester Flames players
F.C. New York players
USL League Two players
USL Championship players
Soccer players from New York (state)
Association football midfielders
Utica City FC players
Major Arena Soccer League players
Armadale SC players
Ontario Fury players
Florida Tropics SC players
Major Arena Soccer League coaches
American soccer coaches
American expatriate soccer players
Expatriate soccer players in Australia
American expatriate sportspeople in Australia
Player-coaches